The Parkersburg–Belpre Bridge is a four-lane cantilever bridge that connects Parkersburg, West Virginia to Belpre, Ohio across the Ohio River. The bridge was completed in 1980. The bridge had been signed U.S. Route 50 (US 50) until June 13, 2008, when that highway was re-routed to the Blennerhassett Island Bridge a few miles to the west, as part of the completion of the Corridor D project around Parkersburg. The American Discovery Trail uses the bridge to cross the Ohio River.

Parkersburg Suspension Bridge
The current bridge replaced a 1916 suspension bridge located just downstream of the present site. The bridge was designed by Hermann Lamb and built by the John A. Roebling's Sons Company of New Jersey. The bridge had a  deck, which included a pedestrian walkway. The suspension bridge was demolished on March 16, 1980.

See also
List of bridges documented by the Historic American Engineering Record in Ohio
List of bridges documented by the Historic American Engineering Record in West Virginia
List of crossings of the Ohio River

References

External links
Parkersburg-Belpre Bridge at Bridges & Tunnels
Photograph of the early stages of construction of the current bridge, December 1976
Photograph of the partial dismantling of the 1916 suspension bridge, February 1980
Description and photographs of the controlled explosive demolition of the 1916 suspension bridge, March 16, 1980, from Controlled Demolition, Inc.

Bridges completed in 1980
Bridges over the Ohio River
Bridges in Washington County, Ohio
Buildings and structures in Parkersburg, West Virginia
Cantilever bridges in the United States
Historic American Engineering Record in Ohio
Historic American Engineering Record in West Virginia
Road bridges in Ohio
Road bridges in West Virginia
Transportation in Wood County, West Virginia
U.S. Route 50
Truss bridges in the United States
1980 establishments in West Virginia
1980 establishments in Ohio
Interstate vehicle bridges in the United States
Belpre, Ohio